Spacetoon Plus is an Indonesian television channel, that specializes in anime, animation and children programs. It has a sister channel in the Arab world. The channel started airing in 2014 in Jakarta alongside Spacetoon and Spacetoon 2.

Programming
 Blazing Teens
 Metal Fight Beyblade
 Candy Candy
 Code Lyoko
 Captain Tsubasa
 Corrector Yui
 Crayon Shinchan
 Ashita no Nadja
 Croket!
 Dragon Warrior
 Akazukin Chacha
 Web Diver
 Dancougar
 Daigunder
 Dragon Ball (compilation with Dragon Ball Z and Dragon Ball GT)
 Dragon Ball Z Kai
 Detective Conan
 Saint Seiya
 Digimon Adventure
 Digimon 02
 Digimon Tamers
 Digimon Frontier
 Digimon Savers 
 Grendizer
 Tokyo Mew Mew
 Flash & Dash
 Atashin-Chi
 DiGi Charat
 DiGi Charat Nyo!
 Kaleido Star
 Kobo-chan
 Pretty Cure
 Pretty Cure MAX Heart
 BLEACH
 Go For Speed
 Hunter × Hunter
 Machine Robo
 Scaredy Squirrel
 Dream Boat
 Norakuro-kun
 Origami Warriors
 Naruto
 Balala the Fairies
 Inakappe Taishō
 Ninja Hattori
 Mermaid Melody
 Gatchaman
 Mechadoc
 Dr. Rin
 Bakugan Battle Brawlers
 Scobby-Doo!
 Taz-Mania
 GeGeGe no Kitaro
 One Piece
 Ultra Maniac
 Hungry Heart
 Kamichama Karin
 Mother Goose and Grimm
 Sailor Moon
 Temple the Balloonist
 The Song of Tentomushi
 Animaniacs
 Sonic X
 VeggieTales
 Adventures of Sonic the Hedgehog
 Ranma ½
 Super Why!
 Yatterman
 Time Bokan
 Yu-Gi-Oh!
 Oggy and the Cockroaches

References

External links 
Spacetoon Indonesia

Children's television networks
Television stations in Indonesia
Mass media in Jakarta
 
Television channels and stations established in 2014
2014 establishments in Indonesia